Richard Savage Lloyd (c.1730–1810), of Hintlesham Hall, Suffolk, was a British landowner and Member of Parliament.

He was the eldest son of Sir Richard Lloyd of Hintlesham, lawyer and solicitor-general and was educated at Eton College (1742–48) and St. John’s College, Cambridge. Like his father before him, he then entered the Middle Temple to study law. He succeeded his father in 1761 to Hintlesham Hall, now a Grade I listed building.

He sat in the House of Commons of Great Britain from 1759 to 1768 as a Member of Parliament (MP)  for Totnes.
 
He married and had 2 sons and 2 daughters and was succeeded by Richard Savage Lloyd, jnr.

References

1730 births
1810 deaths
People from Babergh District
People educated at Eton College
Alumni of St John's College, Cambridge
Members of the Middle Temple
Members of the Parliament of Great Britain for Totnes
British MPs 1754–1761
British MPs 1761–1768